Tweak or tweaker may refer to: 

Tweak, a slang name for methamphetamine
Tweaker, or alternate spelling tweeker, an individual addicted to methamphetamine

Tweak or tweaker may also refer to:

Computing
 Tweaking, the act of making small mechanical or electronic improvements
 In cryptography, particularly disk encryption, tweakable refers to a group of modes of operation for block ciphers
 Tweak (programming environment)
 Tweakers, a Dutch technology website
 TweakVista / Tweak7
 Tweak UI

Other
 Tweak (band)
 Tweaker (band)
 Tweaking (behavior), see Stereotypy, slang term for someone exhibiting compulsive or repetitive behaviour
 Tweek Tweak, a character from the animated television series South Park
 TWEAK, a cytokine encoded by the gene TNFSF12
 Tweak, a character filmed in Octonauts